Sirajganj-3 is a constituency represented in the Jatiya Sangsad (National Parliament) of Bangladesh since 2019 by Abdul Aziz of the Awami League.

Boundaries 
The constituency encompasses Raiganj and Tarash upazilas.

History 
The constituency was created in 1984 from a Pabna constituency when the former Pabna District was split into two districts: Sirajganj and Pabna.

Members of Parliament

Elections

Elections in the 2010s 
Ishaque Hossain Talukder died in October 2014. Gazi MM Amjad Hossain of the Awami League was elected unopposed in December after the Election Commission disqualified the only other candidate in the by-election scheduled for later that month.

Ishaque Hossain Talukder was re-elected unopposed in the 2014 general election after opposition parties withdrew their candidacies in a boycott of the election.

Elections in the 2000s

Elections in the 1990s

References

External links
 

Parliamentary constituencies in Bangladesh
Sirajganj District